4TP, otherwise known as PZInż 140, was a Polish light tank prototype. It was designed by 16 December 1936 by Edward Habich of the Państwowe Zakłady Inżynieryjne works. A light reconnaissance tank, it was to become a heavier replacement for TK-3 and TKS tankettes in Polish service. In addition to light, manoeuvrable chassis, the tank was to feature a turret with one 20 mm nkm wz. 38 FK autocannon and one Ckm wz. 30 machine gun.

Only a single prototype was built. Extensively tested by the army, it proved a reliable vehicle. However, the army decided that by the time serial production could start, the design would already be outdated, and no serial production followed.

References 

Light tanks of the interwar period
Light tanks of Poland
Military vehicles introduced in the 1930s